Charlie Flohr is an American football coach who has currently been the head football coach of the South Dakota Mines Hardrockers since 2020. He previously spent 14 years as an assistant coach at Northwest Missouri State.

Head coaching record

References

External links
 South Dakota Mines profile

Year of birth missing (living people)
Living people
American football wide receivers
Dakota State Trojans football players
Northwest Missouri State Bearcats football coaches
South Dakota Mines Hardrockers football coaches
Truman Bulldogs football coaches